Auriculella pulchra is a species of tropical air-breathing land snails, terrestrial pulmonate gastropod mollusks. This species is endemic to Hawaii archipelago in the United States.

References

Molluscs of the United States
Auriculella
Gastropods described in 1868
Taxonomy articles created by Polbot